Seaham is a suburb of the Port Stephens local government area in the Hunter Region of New South Wales, Australia.

It is a rural community supporting a small but expanding population. At the 2011 census, Seaham had a population of 1,025. Greater Seaham covers an even larger area and incorporates East Seaham, Brandy Hill, Eagleton and Eskdale Estate.

History

First inhabitants
In 1938, Walter John Enright wrote of the district's traditional owners:

On the impacts of colonisation in the Seaham district, Enright says:

On the subject of massacres of Aboriginal people and Torres Strait Islander people by settlers following colonisation, Enright writes:

The Seaham district and environs, however, may not have been entirely without such "frightful blots" on its history. In 1877, a massacre at nearby Wallalong was recounted in correspondence published by the Maitland Mercury and Hunter River General Advertiser:

Reflecting on the massacre, the correspondent goes on to remark that:

While the exact location of the massacre is not provided, an account of floods in 1857 describes how "the first breach it made was at Wallalong, whence the water gradually found its way over a considerable portion of Bowthorne, Hopewell, Barty's Swamps (sic), and all the low lands in that direction". To the east, Wallalong is separated from the "high land" of Brandy Hill, previously known as Ahalton and Warren's Station Paddock, by Barties Swamp. It is possible that the shootings and drownings described as occurring "between the brush and the high land" took place on or about Barties Swamp, below present-day Brandy Hill.

Beginnings through the 19th century
In 1822, Henry Dangar began surveying the Hunter Valley for settlement. Dangar divided the land into counties and parishes, reserving land for a township where the village of Seaham is now situated. About this time, a military station existed at Seaham in the vicinity of what is now Wighton Street. The village at Seaham was proclaimed in the Government Gazette on 26 July 1838. In the ensuing years, the village became a crossroads between neighbouring centres such as Raymond Terrace and Maitland.

In 1838 Dr Henry Carmichael established a vineyard at Porphyry Point, north of the village. In the ensuing decades the vineyard proved prosperous, winning numerous awards in Australia and Europe. The last vintage at Porphyry was in 1915, after which the name and trade mark was sold to Lindemans.

By 1854 the village comprised a post office, National School, Wesleyan Chapel, and an English Church. Classified advertising from the time suggests the town was low-lying and scattered between the river and swampland.

In 1893 homes near the Williams River were inundated during a disastrous flood that caused considerable damage and loss of livestock.

20th century
Prior to the establishment of the railway line between Maitland and Paterson in 1911, a line through Seaham was one of three alternative routes for the North Coast Railway. The proposed line would have connected Morpeth and Clarence Town, via Seaham. The surveyed line is visible on an 1887 map of Seaham, indicating a railway crossing over the Williams River between the township and Brandon House. At a public meeting in Clarence Town during October 1882 it was argued that the line through Seaham would present "more facilities and less engineering difficulties [than the proposed Maitland to Paterson route]". In 1903, the Seaham Hotel opened at the intersection of Dixon and Vine Streets. Thomas McDonald was publican until 1920, at which point Alfred Moore acquired the licence. A decrease in traffic and population forced a later licensee, Jack Laurie, to close the hotel in December 1932 and leave the district. In September 1935, the two-storey brick building was completely destroyed by fire.

In 1913 a flood caused similar damage to the 1893 flood, destroying crops and drowning livestock. The impact of the 1955 Hunter Valley floods on Seaham was not documented.

21st century
In 2002 celebrations were held in Seaham to commemorate the sesquicentenary of Seaham Public School, the centenary of the Seaham School of Arts and the centenary of the consecration of St. Andrew's Anglican Church. These celebrations were unified as Seaham Celebrates and included events that were similar to those held at the 1938 Seaham centenary celebrations.

Bushfires
Since European settlement, there have been a number of reported bushfires in the Seaham district. In June 1888 a bushfire, which did not threaten the town proper, almost engulfed the home of Henrietta Carmichael at Felspar. On 18 February 1926 Seaham came under direct threat from serious bushfires that almost destroyed the Seaham School of Arts and the Seaham Hotel. Another fire on 9 November 1928 destroyed a house on the Brandon estate.

1939 bushfires

Seaham was partially destroyed by bushfires on 14 January 1939, the smoke of which could be seen as far north as Forster. At Porphyry, the circa 1839 home of Mr and Mrs Gavin Ralston was completely destroyed, along with outbuildings and stables. At neighbouring Felspar, the Graham family escaped "with the utmost difficulty" after the roof of a kitchen had collapsed in their burning home. Three automobiles went in the destruction at Felspar, in addition to the period relics and furniture inside the homestead. In Seaham village, the efforts of firefighters were concentrated on extinguishing flames around the post office and School of Arts (1902). Although both public buildings were saved, the Seaham Presbyterian Church, Seaham Public School and several homes were lost. A "desperate battle" was fought at Brandon, south of the town proper, where two homes were lost. A "good save was effected" at the circa 1884 homestead, where the fire was extinguished at the backdoor.

1944 and 1951 bushfires
In 1944, another bushfire swept down on Seaham and nearby Glen Oak. The fire was blocked on Clarence Town Road near the Glen Oak School of Arts. At Seaham, the fire was reported to have jumped the Williams River at Felspar, the same estate where a house of historical importance was lost in the 1939 bushfires.

The town proper came under threat from bushfires again in 1951 from a fire in the Wallaroo State Forest. This bushfire, which also threatened Karuah, was reported to be "out of control" on the night of 15 November 1951, prompting the residents of Seaham to evacuate.

Brandy Hill

Travelling between the quarry and Raymond Terrace meant travelling a circuitous route through the Seaham township so Brandy Hill Drive was constructed to provide a shorter and more direct route. In the 1980s the land around Brandy Hill Drive was subdivided and the estate was named Brandy Hill. On 7 April 2000 the subdivision was formally approved as a locality and became a suburb in its own right. The suburb is almost surrounded by Seaham, while the hill itself remains within the suburb.

Places of local significance

Cemetery
Seaham Cemetery, which is located on the outskirts of the Seaham township, has a traditional layout with headstones dating back to the 1850s. The cemetery is still in use and is maintained by Port Stephens Council.

Deadmans Creek
Between Seaham and Brandy Hill Quarry, the Clarence Town Road crosses a small watercourse named Deadmans Creek. The creek gained this sinister name after 1844 when a man from Clarence Town was found brutally murdered on the road, close to the modern-day crossing. Robert Campbell was found with his throat cut in such a way that his head was almost severed from his body. Closer inspection of the body revealed a gunshot wound on the dead man's jaw. Several hundred metres away, (in the Maitland direction), a large pool of blood was found. Police at the time took this as an indication that the deceased had been dumped near the creek after he was killed.

Edgeworth David quarry

The heritage listed Edgeworth David quarry in Torrence Street is an historic quarry that was gazetted for preservation for scientific purposes in 1925.
 It is named after the Australian geologist Edgeworth David, who discovered signs of late Palaeozoic glaciation in the Seaham area during 1914. The deposits at the quarry, identified as 'varve shale' in 1919, have been considered by geologists as the 'finest [example] in the world'.

The National Parks and Wildlife Service manage the site, which can be visited by everyone interested in geology and geological history of the Seaham area.

Historic properties

Only a handful of Seaham's historic homes are still standing. These include Brandon (established 1884), Burnbrae, and Eskdale. Brandon house still has thick, black tape over its internal windows. The tape was used during World War II to prevent the windows shattering in the case of an air raid. Other important homesteads included Porphyry (established 1838) and Felspar (circa 1878) – both of which were destroyed in the 1939 bushfire.

Brandon House
Brandon, established in 1884 on the site of Alexander Warren's Brandon Hall, is one of the last original homesteads in Seaham. The house has remained in the Fisher family for over 140 years and is the only example of Victorian architecture in the town.

Eskdale House
Eskdale, built in the 1830s, is one of the oldest homesteads in the district and is located on the outskirts of Seaham near Brandy Hill. It was built by Walter Scott, who also built Wallalong House.

Seaham Public School
Although a school has operated at Seaham since 1844, the existing public school began in an iron schoolhouse near the river in 1852. The school moved to the current site after a new schoolhouse and teacher's residence were constructed in 1885. Although both of these buildings were lost in the 1939 bushfire, the school continued to operate on this site in the former Grewsick School. This school, opened in 1895, had served the East Seaham district until 1937 and remained in use at Seaham until a new schoolhouse was built in 1968.

Seaham Swamp Nature Reserve
Seaham Swamp is recognised as an important habitat for the cattle egret and numerous other bird species. In addition to this, the reserve also protects a historic quarry, in which scientifically important sediments from ancient glacial thaw water have been found.

Notes

References

Geology of New South Wales
Natural history of New South Wales
Suburbs of Port Stephens Council
Towns in the Hunter Region